Tarim  is a historic town situated in Wadi Hadhramaut (Valley of Hadhramaut) in Yemen, in the southern part of the Arabian Peninsula. It is widely acknowledged as the theological, juridical, and academic center of the Hadhramaut Valley. An important focus of Islamic learning, it is estimated to contain the highest concentration of descendants of the Islamic Prophet Muhammad (sayyids) anywhere in the world. The city is distinguished for producing numerous Islamic scholars, including Imam al-Haddad. Additionally, Tarim is also home to Dar al-Mustafa, a well-known educational institute for the study of traditional Islamic Sciences.

Geography
The only international flights directly to Seiyun originate in Jeddah (Saudi Arabia, and Dubai and Abu Dhabi in the United Arab Emirates. Otherwise, travelers can fly to the capital city of Sanaa. Then one can either take another flight from Sanaa to Seiyun, or travel by bus or car to Tarim from Sanaa.

Climate
Tarim has a hot desert climate (Köppen climate classification BWh). The city receives very little precipitation. A few times throughout the year, however, Tarim experiences heavy rainfall resulting in significant flooding.

History

Pre-7th century

Wadi Hadhramaut and its tributaries have been inhabited since the Stone Age. Small mounds of flint chippings – debris from the manufacture of stone tools and weapons – and windblown dust can be found close to canyon walls. Further north and east are lines of Thamudic ‘triliths’ with a few surviving crude inscriptions. On the fringes of the Rub' al Khali north of Mahra, a seemingly ancient track leads – according to local legend – to the lost city of Ubar.

Hadhramaut's early economic importance stemmed from its part in the incense trade. Authorities exploited their position on the overland route from Dhufar through Mahra, Hadhramaut and Shabwa to the Hejaz and Eastern Mediterranean to tax caravans in return for protection. Shabwa was Hadhramaut's capital for most of the Himyaritic period. The kingdom of Saba' had its capital at Marib. The Queen of Sheba (Bilqis) could have come from either Saba', or been the Queen of the Tamim (who currently reside east of Tarim). The Himyaritic civilization flourished from c. 800 BC to 400 CE, when the incense trade was diverted to the newly opened sea route via Aden and the Red Sea. Early in the 6th century, Abyssinians invaded Yemen, encouraged by Byzantines to protect Yemeni Christians from Dhu Nuwas, the anti-Christian ruler of Najran who converted to Judaism. The Yemenis opposed Ethiopian rule and sought the Sassanid Persians for assistance. The result was that the Persians took over about 570 CE. The Persians appear to have been in Hadhramaut, but the only clear evidence of their presence is at Husn al-Urr, a fort between Tarim and Qabr Hud.

7th–8th centuries
In 625, Badhan, the Persian Governor of Sanaa accepted Islam and the rest of the country soon followed. Arab historians agree that Tarim was established in the fourth century of Hijra. The citizens of Tarim converted to Islam in the early days of Islam when the delegation of Hadhramaut met the Islamic Prophet Muhammad in Medina in the tenth year of Hijra (631). Tarim is often referred to as Al-Siddiqi City, in honor of Abu-Bakr al-Siddiq, the first caliph of Sunni Islam (r. 632–634). Abu Bakr prayed that Allah would increase Tarim's scholars and water, as its citizens stood with him during the Ridda wars after the Prophet's death (632–633). A battle occurred in Al-Nujir Fortress. in which many of the Prophet's companions (Sahabah) were injured and taken to Tarim for treatment. Some companions however died, and were buried in the cemetery of Zambal.

As part of the Great Arab Expansion, Hadhramis formed a major part of the Arab armies that conquered North Africa and the Iberian Peninsula. In the mid-8th century, a preacher from Basra called "Abdullah bin Yahya" arrived in Hadhramaut and established the Ibadhi rite of Islam. By the 10th century conflict had erupted between the Hashid and Bakil, the two dominant tribes in the Northern Highlands. Sheikh al-Hadi Yahya bin al-Hussain bin al-Qasim ar-Rassi (a sayyid) was called from Medina to settle this affair at Sa'da in 893–897. He founded the Zaidi Imamate which reigned until Imam Al-Badr was deposed in 1962. In 951 CE, Imam Aḥmad bin `Isā Al-Muhājir arrived from Iraq with a large number of followers, and established the Shafi`i madhab of Sunni Islam (according to majority of historians), which remains dominant in the region. A Rabat, or University, was first established in Zabid, in the Tihama, and, later, in Tarim. The latter still functions.

15th century
In 1488, the Kathiris, led by Badr Abu Towairaq, invaded Hadhramaut from the High Yemen and established their dola, first in Tarim and then in Seiyun. The Kathiris employed mercenaries, mainly Yafa'is from the mountains north-east of Aden. About a hundred years after arriving their momentum was lost. The Yafa'is usurped western Hadhramaut and created a separate dola, based at Al-Qatn.

British and the Qu'aiti Dynasty: 1882–1967
In 1809, disaster struck Hadhramaut following a Wahhabi invasion. Valuable books and documents from the Robat at Tarim were destroyed by fire or by dumping in wells. While the Wahhabi occupation was short-lived, it ravaged the economy. As a result, emigration increased, the top destination being Hyderabad (India), where the Nizam employed a considerable army. Here, a Yemeni soldier named Umar bin Awadh al Qu'aiti rose to the rank of Jemadar and amassed a fortune. Umar's influence enabled him to create the Quaiti dynasty in the late 19th century. Having secured all valuable land excluding the areas around Saiyun and Tarim, the Qu'aitis signed a treaty with the British in 1888, and created a unified sultanate in 1902 that became part of the Aden Protectorate.

Ingrams' Peace
Despite establishing a regionally advanced administration, by the 1930s the Qu'aiti Sultan Saleh bin Ghalib (r. 1936–1956) was facing stiff pressure to modernize – a task for which he seriously lacked resources. These demands were largely initiated by returning Yemeni emigrants, such as the Kaf Sayyids of Tarim. The family of Al-Kaf had made fortunes in Singapore, and wished to spend some of their wealth improving living conditions at home. Led by Sayyid Abu Bakr al-Kaf bin Sheikh, they built a motor road from Tarim to Shihr – hoping to use it to import goods into Hadhramaut, but were frustrated by opposition from the camel-owning tribes who had a transport monopoly between the coast and interior.

In February 1937, a peace between the Qu'aiti and Kathiri sultanates, totally unprecedented in the history of that region, was brought about essentially by the efforts of two men: Sayyid Abu Bakr al-Kaf and Harold Ingrams, the first political officer in Hadhramaut. Sayyid Abu Bakr used his personal wealth to finance this peace, which was known universally thereafter as "Ingrams Peace." This brought some stability, permitting introduction of administrative, educational and development measures.

Modern era: 1967 to present
In November 1967, the British withdrew from South Yemen in the face of mass riots and an increasingly deadly insurgency. Their arch-enemies, the National Liberation Front, which was dominated by radical Marxists, seized power, and Tarim, with the rest of South Yemen, came under communist rule. The Aden Protectorate became an independent Communist state, the People's Democratic Republic of Yemen (PDRY). Hadhramaut, despite being part of the communist-aligned PDRY continued to live to a great extent on remittances from abroad. In 1990, South and North Yemen were unified. The town has remained unaffected during the Yemeni Civil War.

Culture
Hadhramaut is considered the most religious part of Yemen.  It is a province in which the mixture of tribal and Islamic traditions determines the social life of its inhabitants. Apart from urban settlements, Hadhramaut is still tribalised, although tribal bonds are no longer as powerful as they once were. Hadhramis live in densely built towns centered on traditional watering stations along the wadis. Hadhramis harvest crops of wheat, millet, tend date palm and coconut groves, and grow some coffee. On the plateau Bedouins tend sheep and goats. The Sayyid aristocracy, descended from Islamic prophet Muhammad, traditionally educated and strict in Islamic observance, are highly respected in both religious and secular affairs. Zaydism is largely confined to the Yemeni mountains, where Hashid and Bakil are the dominant tribes. The rest of Yemen primarily adheres to the Shafi'i school of Islamic jurisprudence. Although Zaydis are Shias and Shafi'is are Sunnis, the practical religious differences are generally minor, and each will freely worship in the others' mosques, if their own is not convenient.

Tribal groups
Nearly all Yemeni tribes are of Himyari origin. Exceptions are mainly of Kindi stock, originating from an invasion from the north in the 6th century. Kindah are credited with the final destruction of Shabwa when they arrived, but they subsequently settled among and intermarried with Himyaris. The incidence of straight rather than curly hair often denotes Kindi blood and some Kindi are bigger physically than most Himyaris. Kindi tribes include the Seiar, Al Doghar (Wadi Hajr), the Ja'ada (Wadi Amd), and one of the sections of the Deyyin (on the plateau south of Amd). Living among the tribes, but a little different, are the Mashaikh. Unlike the tribes, they did not raid nor were they raided. They also wore a different type of jambiya, more designed for domestic use than aggression. Al Buraik still supply the bulk of the population of the Shabwa area. Most are settled but some are nomads grazing with the Kurab. Other Mashaikh are dotted around the hills and valleys. The most important are Al Amoodi of Budha, many being successful traders throughout the Middle East. Most tribesmen and Mashaikh are farmers, those in the mountains and the plateau almost entirely so. Further east or north, however, there is less rainfall and more nomadic people. The Manahil are almost entirely nomadic, except for those absorbed into modern life, and the Hamum and the Mahra are mostly nomadic. On the fringes of the Rub' al Khali, the people continue to graze where they can, although a surprising number of Seiar and Awamr farm on the ill-watered plateau north of the Hadhramaut.

Architecture
Geographically and socially varied, Tarim's diversity can be traced through the cultural interactions and hybrid architectural fabrics of various regions. Foreign styles and ornamental features entered Yemen as typological and aesthetic changes. In this way Tarimi architectural history represents a dialogue between cultures both within and outside of the modern nation.

Mosques and libraries

It is estimated that Tarim contains up to 365 masājid (mosques); one, the Sirjis' Mosque, dates back to the seventh century. From the 17th to the 19th century, these mosques played a decisive role on the influence of Islamic scholarship in the area. The minaret was designed by the local poets Abu Bakr bin Shihab and Alawi Al-Mash-hūr. Completed in 1914, Al-Muhdar Mosque is named in honor of Omar Al-Muhdar, a Muslim leader who lived in the city during the 15th century.

Tarim also features the massive Al-Kaf Library which is attached to Al-Jame'a Mosque and houses more than 5,000 manuscripts from the region covering religion, the thoughts of the Prophets, Islamic law, Sufism, medicine, astronomy, agriculture, biographies, history, mathematics, philosophy, logic, and the eight volumes of Abū Muhammad al-Hasan al-Hamdānī's Al-Iklil (The Crown). Many go back hundreds of years and often contain vibrantly colored illustration. Between 300 and 400 manuscripts are believed to be unique in the Islamic world, according to the scholar Abd al-Qader Sabban. What distinguishes these manuscripts is that the majority belong to Yemeni authors and editors who resided in the Wadi Hadhramaut area. Nevertheless, there are others that belonged to scholars from Morocco, Khurasan, and other Muslim regions. In 1996, estimates for the annual number of visitors to Al-Kaf Library exceeded 4,780 individuals.

Palaces

Tarim is famous for its innumerable palaces – a collection of approximately thirty mansions constructed between the 1870s and 1930s. During the late 19th and early 20th centuries, Hadhramaut's merchant families grew rich from trade and investments abroad. The family of Al-Kaf was considered the most influential. Many members of the family were respected religious scholars. At the same time, they were among the regions first Westernizing elite and contributed to public works projects in the name of modernization. Their palaces remain as testament to both their affluence and the complex identity of the modernizing elite of the colonial period. Palaces financed by Al-Kafs and other families were executed in the stylistic idioms they encountered in British India and Southeast Asia. Consequently, the palaces include examples of Mughal, British Colonial, Art Nouveau, Deco, Rococo, Neo-Classical, and Modernist styles unparalleled in Yemen. While these foreign decorative styles were incorporated into the Tarimi architectural idiom, traditional Hadhrami construction techniques based on the thousand-year-old traditions of unfired mud brick and lime plasters served as the primary methods for executing these buildings.

Qasr al-'Ishshah Complex
The complex of 'Umar bin Shaikh Al-Kaf, Qaṣr al-ʿIshshah is one of the original Kaf houses in Tarim. Shaikh al-Kaf built the house on proceeds made in South Asian trade and investment in Singapore's Grand Hotel de l'Europe during the 1930s. Ishshah derives from the Arabic root ʿ-sh-sh, meaning to nest, take root, or establish. Qasr al-'Ishshah is a collection of several buildings constructed over a forty-year period. The first building, known as Dar Dawil, was constructed during the 1890s. As Umar's family grew, so did the size of the complex.

Qasr al-'Ishshah exhibits some of the finest examples of lime plaster decoration (malas) in Tarim. The decorative program of the exterior south façade finds its antecedents in Mughal royal architecture, as well as the colonial forms of the Near East, South Asia and Southeast Asia. Interior stucco decoration differs from room to room, including Art Nouveau, Rococo, Neo-Classical and combinations of the three. The ornamentation often incorporates pilasters along the walls framing openings, built-in cabinetry with skilled wood carvings, elaborate column capitals, decorated ceilings, niches and kerosene lamp holders, as well as complex color schemes.

From 1970 to 1991, Qasr al-'Ishshah was expropriated by the PDRY and divided up as multi-family housing. The house was recently returned to Al-Kaf family and legal ownership rights are shared amongst many of Shaikh al-Kaf's descendants. In 1997, the Historical Society for the Preservation of Tarim rented half of the house to present the building to the public as a house museum, the only one of its kind in the Hadhramaut.

Education

Rabat Tarim
Rabat Tarim is an educational institution teaching Islamic and Arabic sciences. In 1886, a group of Tarimi notables decided to build a religious institution for foreign and domestic students in Tarim, and accommodate foreign students. Those notables were Mohammed bin Salem Assri, Ahmed bin Omar al-Shatri, Abdul-Qader bin Ahmed al-Haddad, Ahmed bin Abdul-Rahman al-Junied and Mohammed bin Omar Arfan. Rubat Tarim was inaugurated on 2 October 1887. Supervision was ascribed to the mufti of Hadhramaut, Abdul-Rahman Bin Mohammed Al-Meshhūr. Early teachers in Rubat Tarim were Alwi bin Abdul-Rahman bin Abibakr al-Meshhūr, Hussein bin Mohammed al-Kaf, Ahmed bin Abdullah al-Bekri al-Khateeb, Hassan bin Alwi bin Shihab, Abu Bakr bin Ahmed bin Abdullah al-Bekri al-Khatīb and Mohammed bin Ahmed al-Khatīb. They were delegated to teach when Abdullah bin Omar al-Shatri was appointed upon returning from Mecca, where he had studied for four years. Al-Shatri taught at Rubat Tarim voluntarily until his death in 1942. He was succeeded by his sons (Mohammed, Abu Bakr, Hasan and Salem). In 1979, Rubat Tarim was closed by the PDRY. It reopened after the unification of Yemen in 1991 and continues to function.

According to statistics from 2007, the number of scholars graduating from Rubat Tarim has reached over 13,000. Foreign students currently total about 300, with 1,500 Yemeni students. Many graduates later traveled abroad to propagate Islam and establish religious institutions. Several became authors and publishers in the Tradition, Interpretation of Quran and other branches of religious knowledge. The most famous scholar among them was probably Abdul Rahman Al-Mash-hūr.

Other
Dar al-Zahra is a sister institute of Dar al-Mustafa which offers education for Muslim women. Faculty of Sharea and Law, Al-Ahqaff University.

Notable people
Shaykh Al-Habib Umar bin Muhammad bin Salim bin Hafeez – Dean, Dar Al-Mustafa
Shaykh Al-Habib Ali Mashhour bin Muhammad bin Salim bin Hafeez: Imam of the Tarim Mosque and Head of Fatwas Council
Shaykh Amjad Rasheed: Islamic scholar
Abdullah bin Omar al-Shatiri: Islamic scholar, died in 1942
Habib Hasan bin Abdullah al-Shatiri: Grand Shaykh of Tarim, died in 2007.
Al-Habib Salim bin Abdullah al-Shatiri : Grand Shaykh
Al-Habib Kadhim Jafar Muhammad al-Saqqaf Leading scholar, and teacher at Dar Ul Mustafa
Habib 'Ali Zain Al Abideen al-Jifri: Sayyidi Islamic scholar, and leading teacher of Dar Al-Mustafa
Abdul Rahman Al-Mash-hoor
Abu Baker Salem: Arab singer songwriter that gained popularity throughout the Arab world.

See also
 Hadhramaut Mountains
 Qabr Hud

References

Christian, Scott. Perceptions of Pakistan: Yemen: Introduction to Tarim – City of Scholars, 8 January 2006
Hatab, Hasan. The Fellowship of Tarim, Yemen, 2005
Al-Batati, Saeed. Habib Ali Zain al-Abideen al-Jifri Interview, Yemen Times, 18 December 2006
Ellis, Jim. Hadhramaut and Thereabouts December 1997
Conlon, James The Virtual Indian Ocean: Expressing the Significance of Tarim, Yemen, through new Media
Breton, Jean-Francois. Manhattan in the Hadramaut. Saudi Aramco World (June 1986) pages 22,-27

External links
 Official Website of Al-Quaiti Royal Family of Hadhramaut
 The Graves of Tarim: Genealogy and Mobility across the Indian Ocean, by Engseng Ho, a professor at Harvard. California World History series. A 500-year history of Hadramawt's diaspora, the most comprehensive account to date.
 The Tarim Documentation Project (Columbia University)
 Dar Al-Mustafa
 Video of the History of Tarim
 Ba`alawi.com Ba'alawi.com | The Definitive Resource for Islam and the Alawiyyen Ancestry
 Exploring the Sufi crossroads in Tarim, Yemen

Populated places in Hadhramaut Governorate